Scott Neal (born 10 June 1978) is a British actor. He is best known for his roles in The Bill, first in guest roles as Ryan Keating and Carl Simms and later as a regular cast member as PC Luke Ashton, and for his breakout role in landmark LGBT film Beautiful Thing. He is also known for his role in EastEnders as Jason Adams.

Career 
He entered the Anna Scher Theatre School in 1989.  He debuted in The Listening on Channel Four. He has participated in other TV shows such as EastEnders, Emmerdale, Bramwell, Prime Suspect, and London's Burning. He later became a regular appearance on the British television police drama The Bill, playing PC Luke Ashton, a character coming to terms with his own sexuality. PC Ashton and Sgt. Craig Gilmore, played by Hywel Simons, shared the first romantic gay kiss between uniformed police officers on ITV (Episode No. 37 on 22 August 2002), prompting 160 complaints.

He is widely recognised for having appeared in the 1996 gay drama film Beautiful Thing, where he played an abused teenager who falls for the unpopular boy next door played by Glen Berry, also a student at Anna Scher Theatre School.

Scott Neal is featured in Isolation and portrays Charlie, the lead male character in The Wonderland Experience, a feature film directed by Ben Hardyment and shot on location in southern India. In addition, he has participated in the plays Yours Fondly, Zekk Baxter and Morning Glory (2001) as well as in the musical Last Song of the Nightingale (2001).

In 2010 Neal was cast in Hollyoaks by former executive producer of The Bill Paul Marquess.

Personal life 

Scott Neal is openly gay. He is in a relationship with British media executive and businessman Philip O'Ferrall.

Filmography

References

External links
 

1978 births
Living people
Alumni of the Anna Scher Theatre School
21st-century English LGBT people
20th-century English male actors
21st-century English male actors
English gay actors
English male film actors
English male stage actors
English male television actors